Kalappa Muniyappa (born 8 September 1952) is an Indian molecular biologist and geneticist, known for his researches on the chromatization of DNA and gene targeting. He is a professor and chairman of the department of biochemistry of the Indian Institute of Science and an elected fellow of the Indian National Science Academy, Indian Academy of Sciences and the National Academy of Sciences, India. The Council of Scientific and Industrial Research, the apex agency of the Government of India for scientific research, awarded him the Shanti Swarup Bhatnagar Prize for Science and Technology, one of the highest Indian science awards, in 1995, for his contributions to biological sciences.

Biography 
Born on 2 February 1951 in the South Indian state of Karnataka, Kalappa Muniyappa, after graduating in science from Mysore University in 1974, secured his master's degree in 1976 from the same university with first rank. His doctoral degree came from the Indian Institute of Science in 1980 after which he did his post-doctoral studies (1981–86) at the University of Georgia and at Yale University School of Medicine and returned to India in 1987 to join the Indian Institute of Science the next year as a member of faculty. He was made a professor in 1999 and is the incumbent chairman of the department of biochemistry of IISc. In between, he held visiting professorships at American Cancer Society, University of Washington, Seattle, Osaka University, University of Sydney and the Medical Research Council, London.

Legacy 

Focusing his early researches on the molecular basis of homologous genetic recombination and employing RecA paradigm, Muniyappa demonstrated the effects of chromatization of DNA on homologous pairing and strand exchange and his studies are known to have assisted in exploring ways for gene targeting, cell senescence and genome stability. His studies on chromosome synapsis, genetic recombination and telomere dynamics attempted to widen the understanding of cellular recombination and Holliday junction and he is credited with the discovery of a negative regulatory mechanism of homologous recombination. His contributions in deciphering genetic recombination in mycobacterium tuberculosis are also reported to have influenced further researches on the mechanism of genetic exchange and lateral gene transfer. His researches have been published in a number of articles, 136 of which have been listed by ResearchGate, an online article repository.

At the Indian Institute of Science, he set up a laboratory, K. Muniyappa's Lab, to pursue researches in the fields of Cancer biology, Genetics, Biochemistry and Biophysics, where he mentors a number of doctoral and post-doctoral research scholars. Under his leadership, IISc introduced new academic programs such as the integrated PhD program, interdisciplinary program in chemical biology, and national post-doctoral training program in Biotechnology and Life Sciences. He served as their coordinator at inception.

A member of the editorial board of the Journal of Molecular Signaling, he has also been associated with Journal of Biosciences and Indian Journal of Biophysics and Biochemistry as their editorial board member and has served as the vice president and secretary of the Society of Biological Chemists.

Awards and honors 
Muniyappa received the Hanumantha Rao Memorial Medal of the IISc in 1980 and the Rockefeller Foundation Career Development Award in 1992. The Council of Scientific and Industrial Research awarded him the Shanti Swarup Bhatnagar Prize, one of the highest Indian science awards, in 1995. The same year, he received the M. Sreenivasaya Memorial Award of the Indian Institute of Science. The American Cancer Society extended the Eleanor Roosevelt Fellowship Award to him in 1995. He received the Yamagiwa International Cancer Fellowship Award in 1999. The Indian Science Congress Association selected him for the Anima Sen Memorial Award in 2002. In 2007 he received the Indian Institute of Science Alumnus Award and the Kempe Gowda Award of the Bruhat Bengaluru Mahanagara Palike (BBMP). He was given the Sir M. Visvesvaraya Award for lifetime contributions to Science & Technology by GoK, and the Karnataka Rajyotsava Award by GoK. A founder member of the Karnataka State Academy for Science and Technology, Muniyappa is an elected fellow of the Indian National Science Academy and the Indian Academy of Sciences. He was elected to The World Academy of Sciences (TWAS) and the National Academy of Sciences, India.

See also 

Prof. K. Muniyappa has been awarded G.N.R. Gold Medal for Excellence in Science & Technology (CSIR).
Prof K. Muniyappa has been conferred the prestigious CSIR Bhatnagar Fellowship.

References

External links

Further reading 
 

Recipients of the Shanti Swarup Bhatnagar Award in Biological Science
1952 births
Scientists from Karnataka
University of Mysore alumni
Indian Institute of Science alumni
Academic staff of the Indian Institute of Science
University of Georgia alumni
Yale University alumni
American Cancer Society people
University of Washington faculty
Academic staff of Osaka University
Academic staff of the University of Sydney
Medical Research Council (United Kingdom) people
Indian molecular biologists
Indian geneticists
Living people
Indian scientific authors
Fellows of the Indian Academy of Sciences
Fellows of the Indian National Science Academy
Fellows of The National Academy of Sciences, India
20th-century Indian biologists